The 1989 British League season (also known as the Sunbrite British League for sponsorship reasons) was the 55th season of the top tier of speedway in the United Kingdom and the 25th known as the British League.

Summary
The Coventry Bees were the defending champions from 1988. The league was once again run over a 15-heat formula, with 7 riders per team.

Oxford Cheetahs bounced back to winning ways claiming their third title in five years. The team was led by their double world champion Hans Nielsen who by the end of the season would be world champion for the third time and top the averages for an incredible seventh season running. He was backed up by Simon Wigg, Martin Dugard, Andy Grahame, Marvyn Cox and Troy Butler, all of whom averaged from about 6 to 8 points for the season. The defending champions Coventry could only finish 5th after losing Tommy Knudsen for the season. Cradley Heath won thir 8th Knockout Cup in 11 years (it would also be their last).

Final table
M = Matches; W = Wins; D = Draws; L = Losses; Pts = Total Points

British League Knockout Cup
The 1989 Speedway Star British League Knockout Cup was the 51st edition of the Knockout Cup for tier one teams. Cradley Heath Heathens were the winners for the fourth successive year if including the tied 1986 final.

First round

Quarter-finals

Semi-finals

Final

First leg

Second leg

Cradley Heath were declared Knockout Cup Champions, winning on aggregate 95-85.

Leading final averages

Riders & final averages
Belle Vue

 Shawn Moran 9.68
 Kelly Moran 8.29
 Peter Ravn 7.54
 Gary Hicks 7.17
 Chris Morton 6.75
 Joe Screen 6.40
 Carl Stonehewer 5.50
 Gordon Whitaker 3.41
 Paul Smith 2.09
 Mike Lewthwaite 1.85

Bradford

 Paul Thorp 7.79
 Neil Evitts 7.51
 Andy Smith 7.27
 Bryan Larner 5.40
 Henrik Kristensen 4.94
 Glenn Doyle 4.76
 Antal Kocso 4.60
 Michael Graves 4.17

Coventry

  Kelvin Tatum 9.49
  Rick Miller 6.93
  Sean Wilson 6.52
  John Jørgensen 6.39
  Andy Hackett 5.49
  Roman Matoušek 5.27
  Kai Niemi 4.69
  Mike Bacon 2.95
  Paul Smith 2.55

Cradley Heath

  Jan O. Pedersen 10.22
  Erik Gundersen 9.97
  Simon Cross 9.13
  Gert Handberg 6.52
  Greg Hancock 6.06
  Alan Grahame 5.78
  John Bostin 3.00

Kings Lynn

  Richard Knight 7.83
  Lance King 7.67
  John Davis 6.74
  Allan Johansen 6.65
  Armando Dal Chiele 5.03
  Stephen Davies 4.93
  Dennis Löfqvist 4.82
  Adrian Stevens 3.56
  Paul Smith 3.14
  Roger Horspool 1.50

Oxford

  Hans Nielsen 10.91
  Simon Wigg 7.69
  Martin Dugard 7.61
  Andy Grahame 6.91
  Marvyn Cox 6.80
  Troy Butler 5.96
  Paul Dugard 2.56
  Kevin Pitts 1.64

Reading

  Jeremy Doncaster 8.61
  Mitch Shirra 7.62
  Tony Olsson 6.49
  Carl Blackbird 5.52
  Armando Castagna 5.47
  Dave Mullett 5.09
  Malcolm Holloway 4.38
  David Steen 2.56

Swindon

  Jimmy Nilsen 8.41
  Brian Karger 8.09
  Andrew Silver 7.38
  John Davis 6.67
  Peter Nahlin 6.24
  Bart Bast 5.05
  Gary Chessell 4.88
  David Smart 3.72

Wolverhampton

  Sam Ermolenko 9.85
  Ronnie Correy 7.86
  Neil Collins 6.88
  Robert Pfetzing 6.61
  Graham Jones 6.60
  Jan Staechmann 6.54
  Andy Phillips 5.73

See also
List of United Kingdom Speedway League Champions
Knockout Cup (speedway)

References

British League
1989 in British motorsport
1989 in speedway